Herbert Onyewumbu Wigwe CON (born 15 August 1966 in Lagos) to parents of Ikwerre descent from Omueke Isiokpo, is a Nigerian banker and entrepreneur. He is currently CEO of Access Holdings Plc, traded as Access Corporation. Herbert was the Group Managing Director/CEO of Access Bank plc, one of Nigeria's top five banking institutions, after succeeding his business partner, Aigboje Aig-Imoukhuede in January 2014 till April 2022.

Education
Wigwe has a degree in accountancy from the University of Nigeria, an MA in Banking and Finance from the University College of North Wales (now Bangor), an MSc in Financial Economics from the University of London, and is an Alumnus of the Harvard Business School Executive Management Program.

Career
Wigwe started his career at Coopers & Lybrand, Lagos as a management consultant, later qualifying as a chartered accountant. After a stint at Capital Bank, he joined GTBank where he spent over a decade working in corporate and institutional banking, rising to become the executive director in charge of institutional banking.

In 2002, Wigwe and his business partner, Aigboje Aig-Imoukhuede bought into what was then a small commercial bank, Access Bank – at the time, the 65th largest of the 89 banks in the country.

Over the past 30 years, Access Corporation has evolved from an obscure Nigerian Bank into a world-class African financial institution. Today, the Corporation is one the largest in Nigeria in terms of assets, loans, deposits and branch network; a feat which has been achieved through a robust long-term approach to client solutions – providing committed and innovative services from Banking, Payments, Lending, to Insurance and Pension Assets.

Access Bank is now one of the top five banks in Nigeria and ranked among the top 500 global banks according to a 2015 report by The Banker magazine and is aiming to be Africa's top bank. It currently serves over 6.5 million account-holders, through 350 branches and with more than 1,500 ATMs in major centres across Nigeria, Sub-Saharan Africa and the UK.

As one of Nigeria's foremost corporate bankers, he has helped develop some of Africa's biggest companies in the construction, telecommunications, energy and oil and gas sectors through a unique model, which involves understanding and providing financial support and expertise. His career in financial services spans more than 25 years including over a decade as Deputy Managing Director.

Wigwe also served as the Chairman of Access Bank Ghana Limited, Access Investment & Securities Limited, Central Securities and Clearing System (CSCS) and is the current Chairman of Access Bank (UK) Limited. He is a board member of Nigerian Mortgage Refinance Company and a member of the advisory Board for Friends Africa. He is a Fellow of the Institute of Chartered Accountants of Nigeria (ICAN – FCA), a Fellow of The Institute of Credit Administration, and an Honorary member of the Chartered Institute of Bankers of Nigeria.

Since January 2014, he has been CEO and Group Managing Director of Access Bank.

He has had speaking engagements across the world including most recently at Silicon Valley and Financial Times summit in Mozambique.

In 2016, Wigwe founded The HOW Foundation, a non-profit organization.

Awards and achievements
Under Wigwe, Access Bank has amassed quite a number of awards. In 2016, it won Bank of the Year and CEO of the Year at the BusinessDay Banking awards in Lagos. It also clinched three prestigious awards at the annual Africa Banking Awards for the "Outstanding Business Sustainability" in the 2016 Karlsruhe Sustainable Finance Awards in Germany, the first ever for an African financial institution. Access Bank Plc repeated the performance at the 2017 Karlsruhe Sustainable Finance Awards in Germany by receiving the "Outstanding Business Sustainability Achievement Award".

Wigwe himself was named 2016 Banker of The Year separately by The Sun and Vanguard newspapers, two of Nigeria's biggest newspapers.

The Boys' Brigade Nigeria
In recognition of "his exemplary role in the society and contributions to youth development", the Boys' Brigade (BB),  inaugurated Herbert Wigwe, as State Patron for Lagos State Council in 2016.

In October 2022, a Nigerian national honour of Commander of the Order of the Niger (CON) was conferred on him by President Muhammadu Buhari.

The Access Conference

Wigwe was involved in the creation of ‘Thought-Leadership Series’ known as The Access Conference. The biennial event is Access Bank’s response to a global call for corporate involvement in resolving the major challenges facing humanity. Since its inauguration in 2013, the Access Conference has consistently engaged global leaders by provoking debates on issues of threats and opportunities to the world. In the 2013 edition  themed ‘Sustainable Leadership’, Wigwe spoke alongside George W. Bush, Nicolas Sarkozy and John Kufuor, reaffirming the importance of leadership to national and corporate successes.

At the 2015 edition, Wigwe hosted global leaders such as Steve Wozniak, N. R. Narayana Murthy and José María Figueres, Muhammad Yunus and Ted Souder (Head, Industry (Retail) at Google for discussion of the theme ‘Leading in a Transformational World – The Imperative of Innovation’.

Philanthropy
Wigwe, Access Bank and UNICEF have a collaboration in place to offer support to vulnerable children, orphans and internationally displaced persons in the northern part of Nigeria. To raise awareness for this purpose, the bank organizes the annual high-profile Access Bank/UNICEF Charity Shield Polo tournament.

In February 2017, he was named co-chair of Nigerian Business Coalition against AIDS (NiBUCCA), a private sector initiative to help eradicate HIV/AIDS in Nigeria and support people living with the condition.

Personal life
In January 2015, Nigerian newspaper The Punch described him as "one of Nigeria's stylish top executives". He is married to Chizoba Wigwe (née Nwuba) and has 4 children: Chizi, Tochi, Hannah and David. He hails from Ikwerre Local Government Area of Rivers State, but lives and works in Lagos. He has 3 sisters and 1 brother: Joyce, Peggy, Stella and Emeka as well as 2 nieces: Aleruchi and Zara including 4 nephews: Ruchi, Oj, Chinweike and Obumneke..

References 

Nigerian bankers
Nigerian economists
Businesspeople from Ibadan
Living people
1966 births
University of Nigeria alumni
Alumni of the University of London
Nigerian chairpersons of corporations
Chevening Scholars